The Hamburger Bank was a public credit institution founded in 1619 by the Free City of Hamburg. It operated independently until 31 December 1875, when it became part of the newly created Reichsbank.

History

The Hamburg City Council made the decision to create the bank in February 1619, following lengthy negotiations with its civic stakeholders. Like its model, the Amsterdamsche Wisselbank which had been founded in 1609, it was intended to improve monetary stability in uncertain times and to simplify trade between merchants. The numerous English merchant adventurers, Portuguese Sephardi Jews and Dutch religious refugees living in Hamburg at the time brought their capital and knowledge to the bank, thus contributing to its initial success.

The bank was administered free of charge by two senators, two City elders (Oberalten), two "treasury citizens" (Kammereibürger) and five "bank citizens" (Bancobürger), namely citizens who had an account at the bank. The bank's premises were in Hamburg City Hall. To open an account at the bank, one had to bring an initial amount of at least 400 Lübeck Marks. In addition, regulations were issued that prohibited bills of exchange and private trade in metallic money, and bills of exchange over 400 Lübeck Marks had to be processed through the Hamburger Bank.

On 20 November 1619, Lehnbanco was founded as a department of the Hamburger Bank. It gave loans against collateral to merchants as well as to the City of Hamburg itself. The Hamburger Bank was also assigned the municipal mint and the municipal grain warehouse, but these still had independently accounting. From 1725 to 1736, the Courantbank was set up as a subdivision of the Hamburger Bank, with the aim to counteract massive currency debasement at the time. Courant is an old word for currency and refers to coins whose precious metal content supports their value.

The Hamburger Bank held a reputation for good governance and integrity. German economist  described it as follows:

The Savary brothers made similar observations:

The bank weathered successive crises with various degrees of success. Unsecured loans were a fundamental problem. In 1770 the bank was comprehensively reformed. During the era of Napoleonic rule in Hamburg, the bank was looted and hit hard by economic crisis, but it survived. 

The Hamburger Bank ceased to be a stand-alone entity following the Unification of Germany and was converted into a branch of the newly created Reichsbank at the end of 1875.

Units of account

The bank's unit of account was the Reichsthaler banco, worth 3 Hamburg mark banco or 48 schillings banco. On the date of the bank's foundation, this Bankothaler corresponded to the fine silver weight of the Reichsthaler based on the Imperial Minting Standard (Reichsmünzfuß) of 1566. 

Similar to the Amsterdam Wisselbank, the Hamburger Bank was established in 1619 in order to guarantee the full silver equivalent of the German Empire's Reichsthaler despite the ensuing crises of the Thirty Years' War and the resulting Kipper und Wipper financial crisis. While originally defined as th a Cologne Mark of fine silver (or 25.984 g silver), Amsterdam's more extensive operations meant that its Dutch rijksdaalder's slightly lower standard of 25.4 g silver prevailed (hence, 8.46 g silver per Mark Banco). Silver received from depositors were converted in the books in reichsthalers banco of 3 marks or 48 schillings credited to their accounts (or Folium). From there they could make cashless payments to other account holders with full confidence of payment in the right quantity of silver.

Since the Reichsthaler Banco was viewed as stable in value, it was used in wholesale and mortgage loans, and merchants carried their books in Thalers and Marks Banco. Rates for other currencies and goods were published regularly, the most important of which is the daily exchange rate of gold coins or bullion into silver standard marks banco. The reichsthaler banco of Hamburg and Amsterdam was also equal in value to the Danish rigsdaler specie and the Norwegian rigsdaler specie.

In 1770 the bank's currency unit was modified so that a Cologne Mark of silver made 9 reichsthalers banco or 27 marks banco (hence, 25.28 g fine silver per reichsthaler or 8.43 g per mark), or 59 marks banco per Zollpfund (Customs Pound of 500 g fine silver). The Reichsthaler Banco was worth 1.5169 Vereinsthalers of 16 g fine silver introduced by the Vienna Monetary Treaty of 1857.

At the time of German currency unification in 1875, the new currency was named Mark (the German gold mark), as a comparatively neutral choice to replace the various southern Guilders and northern Thalers, and to accommodate sensitivities in Hamburg about the disappearance of the celebrated local bank. Hamburg's currency was retired at 1 mark banco = 1.5 German marks and 1 reichsthaler banco = 4.5 German gold marks. The German national currency would retain the name Mark, inherited from the Hamburger Bank, until its replacement by the euro.

Namesake

On 24 July 1861 a cooperative bank was founded with a similar name, the "Hamburger Bank von 1861 Volksbank eG".

Notes

1619 establishments in Europe
Hamburg
Banking in Germany
Former central banks